Jean-Louis Martinet (born 8 November 1912, Sainte-Bazeille, died 20 December 2010) is a French composer. He studied at the Schola Cantorum with Charles Koechlin and at the Conservatoire de Paris with Jean Roger-Ducasse and Olivier Messiaen. He also studied privately with René Leibowitz. In 1971 he was appointed professor at the Conservatoire de musique du Québec à Montréal.

References

1912 births
2010 deaths
Conservatoire de Paris alumni
Academic staff of the Conservatoire de musique du Québec à Montréal
French composers
French male composers
Schola Cantorum de Paris alumni
20th-century French musicians
20th-century French male musicians